Sigurd Barrett (born 20 January 1967) is a Danish pianist, entertainer, composer, and writer and creator of "Pilfingerdansen". As a musician he operates in many genres (jazz, classical, etc.) and he is popular with different age-groups.

Biography
Sigurd Barrett played the piano for the first time as a two-year-old. At the age of six he composed his first songs. In 1979 he got his first paid job and the following years he played a lot of jobs.
He graduated 1992 from Århus University where he studied music with top grades.

His breakthrough was in the TV show "Hit med Sangen" and has later had shows himself. Among others: Sigurds Bjørnetime, a children's program with musical accompaniment; Sigurd og Symfoniorkestret(Sigurd and the symphony orchestra), a program teaching classical music to children; Sigurds Ulvetime, a musical TV show for adults.
He made "Pilfingerdansen" in 2002.

External links
http://www.sigurdbarrett.dk
http://www.hejsigurd.dk

1967 births
Living people
Danish pianists
21st-century pianists